The 2019 Broadland District Council election took place on 2 May 2019 to elect members of the Broadland District Council in England. They were held on the same day as other local elections.

Summary

Election result

Ward results

Acle

Aylsham

Blofield with South Walsham

Brundall

Burlingham

Buxton

Coltishall

Drayton North

Drayton South

Eynesford

Great Witchingham

Hellesdon North

Hellesdon South East

Hevingham

Horsford and Felthorpe

Marshes

Old Catton and Sprowston West

Plumstead

Reepham

Spixworth with St. Faiths

Sprowston Central

Sprowston East

Taverham North

Taverham South

Thorpe St. Andrew North West

Thorpe St. Andrew South East

Wroxham

By-elections

Brundall

Old Catton & Sprowston West

Thorpe St. Andrew North West

References

2019 English local elections
May 2019 events in the United Kingdom
2019
2010s in Norfolk